Tasić is a Serbian surname, derived from the given name Tasa, a diminutive of Atanasije (Athanasius).

Geographical distribution
As of 2014, 94.3% of all known bearers of the surname Tasić were residents of Serbia (frequency 1:354), 1.8% of Kosovo (1:4,714), 1.4% of the Republic of Macedonia (1:6,862) and 1.3% of Bosnia and Herzegovina (1:12,494).

In Serbia, the frequency of the surname was higher than national average (1:354) in the following districts:
 1. Pčinja District (1:56)
 2. Jablanica District (1:78)
 3. Nišava District (1:113)
 4. Pomoravlje District (1:178)
 5. Toplica District (1:227)
 6. Zaječar District (1:243)
 7. Podunavlje District (1:306)

People
Aleksandar Tasić (born 1988), Serbian footballer
Ana Tasić (born 1978), Serbian theatre critic
Ivan Tasić (born 1979), Serbian footballer
Lazar Tasić (1931–2003), Serbian footballer
Nikola Tasić (born 1994), Serbian football goalkeeper

See also
Tasković

References

Serbian surnames